Stepfather II (also known as Stepfather II: Make Room for Daddy) is a 1989 American psychological thriller film directed by Jeff Burr and written by John Auerbach. It is a sequel to The Stepfather (1987) and stars Terry O'Quinn as the title character. The cast includes Meg Foster, Caroline Williams, and Jonathan Brandis.

Stepfather II received a limited theatrical release on November 3, 1989, and grossed $1.5 million at the box office. It received negative reviews from film critics.

A sequel, Stepfather III, was released in 1992.

Plot 
After surviving being shot and stabbed at the end of the previous film, Jerry Blake is institutionalized in Puget Sound, Washington. Blake has meetings with his psychiatrist. Having gained his trust he kills the psychiatrist and a guard. He dons the guard's uniform to help him escape. Arriving at a train depot, Blake kills and robs a traveling salesman for his car and money. Blake checks into a hotel, alters his appearance, assumes the identity of deceased publisher Gene F. Clifford, and travels to Palm Meadows, Los Angeles.

In Palm Meadows, Gene poses as a psychiatrist and soon meets Carol Grayland and leases a house across the street from her and her 13-year-old son Todd. During a session with the neighborhood wives, Gene learns that Carol's husband Philip left his family the previous year. Gene begins courting Carol, eventually winning over her and Todd, but Phil returns, wanting to reconcile with his wife. Needing Phil out of the way, Gene persuades Carol to send him over for a meeting, during which Gene smashes a bottle on his head then stabs him to death. He covers up Phil's disappearance afterward by making it look like he simply ran off again. With Phil gone, Gene and Carol arrange to get married.

Matty Crimmins, local mail carrier and Carol's best friend, becomes suspicious of Gene and begins looking through Gene's mail. She finds a letter addressed to the real Gene Clifford (which includes a photograph revealing him to be African American). She confronts Gene, demanding to know who he really is.  Gene persuades her to let him tell Carol the truth about his past. Later that night, after making love to Carol, Gene sneaks into Matty's house and strangles her to death, making her death look like a suicide. On his way out, Gene takes Matty's last bottle of wine and crosses through the yard of Matty's blind neighbor Sam Watkins, who hears Gene whistling "Camptown Races," which he mentions to Carol the next day.

Despite Matty's death, the wedding proceeds as planned. While dressing in the church, Carol recognizes bottles of wine sent by Matty's parents as the same brand Gene had the other night, and overhears Todd whistling "Camptown Races", which he says Gene taught him. Thinking Gene may have had something to do with Matty's death, Carol confronts him, prompting Gene to attack Carol and Todd, whom he locks in a storage closet. As Gene prepares to kill Carol with a knife she used to stab him, Todd breaks out of the closet and saves his mother, knocking the knife out of Gene's hand and stabbing him in the chest with a claw hammer, apparently killing him. As Carol and Todd walk into the wedding ceremony, everyone is shocked to see them covered in blood until Carol collapses on the floor. The film ends with Gene getting up, stumbling through the room for the wedding party and collapsing on the floor by the destroyed wedding cake, weakly uttering "Till death...", then seemingly dying from his wounds.
In the extended version, after Carol and Todd are sent to recoveries, the scene shows that they are finally living happier and confident without Gene as they enjoy playing together in the park.

Cast

 Terry O'Quinn as Jerry Blake / Gene F. Clifford / The Stepfather 
 Meg Foster as Carol Grayland
 Caroline Williams as Matty Crimmins
 Jonathan Brandis as Todd Grayland
 Henry Brown as Dr. Joseph Danvers
 Mitchell Laurance as Phil Grayland
 Miriam Byrd-Nethery as Sally Jenkins
 Leon Martell as Ralph "Smitty" Smith 
 Renata Scott as Betty Willis
 John O'Leary as Sam Watkins
 Glen Adams as Salesman
 Eric Brown as Hotel Attendant
 Bob Gray as Choir Singer
 Rosemary Welden as Video Date

Production

Development
After a test screening of the film, studio executives Harvey and Bob Weinstein complained about the lack of blood and demanded re-shoots. Jeff Burr refused and director Doug Campbell was hired to do the reshoots. In an interview, Burr commented, "they cut a little bit of [the film] out and they added some badly done blood effects. Badly done, because Terry O’Quinn refused to do it. Really, they were meaningless, so that was irritating."

Release

Home media 
After the film's theatrical release, it was released on VHS by HBO Video in the United States, and in Canada around the same time by Cineplex Odeon. In 2003, the film was released on DVD by Miramax Films and the same year in Canada by Alliance Atlantis; it included audio commentary with director Jeff Burr and producer Darin Scott. In 2009, to coincide with the release of the Screen Gems remake of the original Stepfather, Synapse Films re-released Stepfather II on DVD with special features including the ones available on the Miramax and Alliance Atlantis releases, as well as new features such as a making-of documentary.

Reception

Box office
Stepfather II was originally intended to be released direct to video; however, the producers were impressed enough with the sequel that it was released into theaters.  The film was given a limited release theatrically in the United States by Millimeter Films on November 3, 1989.  It grossed $1,519,796 domestically at the box office.

Critical response
The film received mostly negative reviews, with a 0% approval rating from Rotten Tomatoes and an average rating of 3.68/10 based on 5 reviews. Variety stated "this dull sequel reduces the intriguing premise of the original Stepfather to the level of an inconsequential, tongue-in-cheek slasher film". Richard Harrington of The Washington Post wrote that the film was cliche-ridden and lacked the reality-rooted horror that made the original film effective, finishing his review by stating "Stepfather 2 is just slick marketing trying to capitalize on unsettling art - and failing badly, at that".

References

External links 
 
 
 
 DVD review of Special Edition and production history

1989 films
1989 horror films
1980s psychological thriller films
1980s slasher films
American sequel films
Films directed by Jeff Burr
Films scored by Jimmy Manzie
American serial killer films
American slasher films
ITC Entertainment films
American psychological horror films
Films set in Washington (state)
Films set in California
1980s English-language films
1980s American films